Kandukur Revenue Division (or Kandukur Division) is an administrative division in the Nellore district of the Indian state of Andhra Pradesh. It is one of the 4 revenue divisions in the district which consists of 7 mandals under its administration. Kandukur is the administrative headquarters of the division.

Administration 
There are 7 mandals in Kandukuru revenue division which include

History

See also 
List of revenue divisions in Andhra Pradesh
List of mandals in Andhra Pradesh

References 

Revenue divisions in Nellore district